Silsden is a civil parish in the metropolitan borough of the City of Bradford, West Yorkshire, England.  It contains 63 listed buildings that are recorded in the National Heritage List for England.  Of these, three are listed at Grade II*, the middle of the three grades, and the others are at Grade II, the lowest grade.  The parish contains the town of Silsden and the surrounding countryside.  Most of the listed buildings are houses, cottages and associated structures, farmhouses and farm buildings.  The other listed buildings include an aqueduct for water supply and a tower involved with its construction, a canal aqueduct and warehouse, a footbridge, churches and associated structures, three milestones, and a former textile mill.


Key

Buildings

References

Citations

Sources

 

Lists of listed buildings in West Yorkshire
Listed